The first season of Next Top Model by Cătălin Botezatu premiered on Thursday February 3, 2011 at 20:20 on Antena 1. The competition was hosted by Romanian fashion designer Cătălin Botezatu making him the fifth male host of the Next Top Model franchise. The rest of the panel was composed of photographer Gabriel Hennessey, make-up artist Mirela Vascan, hair stylist Laurent Tourette and model agent Liviu Ionescu. The winner of the competition was 16 year-old Emma Dumitrescu from Bucharest. The international destinations for this season were Giza, Rovaniemi, Dubai, and Paris.

Cast

Contestants
(Ages stated are at start of contest)

Judges
Cătălin Botezatu - Host
Gabriel Hennessey - Photographer 
Laurent Tourette - Hair stylist
Liviu Ionescu - MRA Models
Mirela Vescan - Makeup artist

Episodes

Episode 8
First aired March 24, 2011
First call-out: Mădălina Barbu
Bottom two: Alexandra Băbăscu & Laura Dumitru
Eliminated: None

Episode 9
First aired March 31, 2011
First call-out: Mădălina Barbu
Bottom two: Alexandra Băbăscu & Roxana Cristian
Eliminated: Alexandra Băbăscu

Episode 10
First aired April 7, 2011
First call-out: Emma Dumitrescu
Bottom two: Roxana Cristian & Laura Dumitru
Eliminated: Laura Dumitru

Episode 11
First aired April 14, 2011
First call-out: Mădălina Barbu
Bottom two: Emma Dumitrescu & Roxana Cristian
Eliminated: Roxana Cristian
Featured Photographer: Mihai Stetcu

Episode 12
First aired April 21, 2011
Final two: Emma Dumitrescu & Mădălina Barbu
Winner: Emma Dumitrescu

Results

 The contestant was eliminated.
 The contestant was disqualified from the competition.
 The contestant was part of a non-elimination bottom two.
 The contestant won the competition.

In Episode 1, Adela and Diana were introduced to the competition after the finalists had been selected.
In Episode 6, Lucia was disqualified for her violent behavior towards Emma before the actual elimination began.
In Episode 7, Mădălina did not participate in the photo shoot.
In Episode 8, Alexandra and Laura Landed in the bottom two, but neither of them was eliminated.

Photo shoots
Episode 8 photo shoot: In Dubai's desert with a falcon 
Episode 9 photo shoots: Swimsuits on the beach overlooking Burj Al Arab; polo players
Episode 10 photo shoot: Ameno Temple 
Episode 11 photo shoot: Sighişoara Citadel
Episode 12 photo shoots: Black Swan; simplistic beauty shots

References

External links
 Official website

2011 Romanian television seasons
2011 Romanian television series debuts
Antena 1 (Romania) original programming